Darreh Pahn or Darrehpahn may refer to:
 Darreh Pahn, Hormozgan
 Darreh Pahn, Khuzestan